Joy Elaine Hruby  (1 July 1927 – 21 February 2017) was an Australian actress and entertainer, comedian, TV presenter and interviewer, producer, film-maker, author and celebrity agent with a career spanning more than 50 years. 
 
Hruby appeared in films including Caddie, The Love Letters from Teralba Road, Winter of our Dreams, and Kitty and the Bagman.

Hruby had small roles in TV soap operas including, Sons and Daughters and Home and Away, G.P. and All Saints and featured the mini-series Brides of Christ, she also appeared in numerous theatre productions and entered films into Tropfest.

Biography
Hruby was born in Taree, New South Wales, the fourth of five siblings to Grace Adelaide Esther Thomas, a public speaker, union woman, community worker and suffragist and Henry "Harry" James Cox, who was a station master at Dubbo during WWII, and ham radio enthusiast and maker of steel guitars. She married Czech jazz pianist Zdenek Hruby in 1954 and the couple had three children: actress Anna Hruby, Frank (a cameraman) and Janette (a former film location caterer). Hruby studied at the Whitehall Academy of Dramatic Arts and then the J.C. Williamson theatre, and appeared in a production of Othello as Desdemona.

Hruby also had a community TV program on Channel 31 (later TVS) in Sydney and Melbourne titled Joy's World. She was known for brightly-coloured feathered costumes and feather boas, and her signature sign-off line, "...and keep smiling". After Prime Minister Malcolm Turnbull cancelled community television, she launched her own website and YouTube channel.

Her contribution to the arts and entertainment was recognised with an Order of Australia Medal (OAM) in the 2007 Queen's New Years Honours List. Published in 2003, she wrote a wartime memoir, Dubbo Dazzlers, which was also the name of a dance troupe she formed in Dubbo during WWII. Hruby had previously written notes for a biography titled The Spectacular Life of Joy Hruby. She won a Critics' Circle Theatre Award for Half in Ernest.

Hruby was later married to Denny, a pianist. She died, aged 89 on 21 February 2017. Her service was held at Wilde Street Anglican Church at Maroubra, New South Wales on 2 March 2017.

Filmography

Film

Television

References

External links
Joy's World website
 

1927 births
2017 deaths
Actresses from Sydney
Australian film actresses
Australian soap opera actresses
Australian television personalities
Recipients of the Medal of the Order of Australia
People from Dubbo
20th-century Australian actresses
21st-century Australian actresses